Mama is a 2013 supernatural horror film directed and co-written by Andy Muschietti in his directorial debut and based on his 2008 Argentine short film Mamá. The film stars Jessica Chastain, Nikolaj Coster-Waldau, Megan Charpentier, Isabelle Nélisse, Daniel Kash, and Javier Botet as the title character.

The film follows two young girls abandoned in a forest cabin, fostered by an unknown entity that they fondly call "Mama", which eventually follows them to their new suburban home led by two adults after their uncle retrieves them.

It was produced by J. Miles Dale and co-writer Barbara Muschietti, with Guillermo del Toro serving as executive producer. The film was theatrically released in theaters on 18 January 2013, by Universal Pictures. Mama received mixed reviews from critics, with many praising the performances and atmosphere, with criticism for plot and writing. The film was a box office success, grossing $148 million against a $15 million budget.

Plot
Distraught after losing his fortune in the 2008 financial crisis, stockbroker Jeffrey Desange murders his colleagues and his estranged wife before taking his young daughters, 3-year-old Victoria and 1-year-old Lily, away from home. Driving dangerously fast on a snowy road, Jeffrey loses control; the car slides down the mountain and crashes into the woods, breaking Victoria's glasses. Surviving the collision, he takes the children into an abandoned cabin. Planning to kill his daughters and then himself, he prepares to shoot Victoria but is attacked and killed by a shadowy figure.

Five years later, a rescue party, sponsored by Jeffrey's identical twin brother Lucas, finds a now 8-year-old Victoria and a now 6-year-old Lily in the cabin, alive but in a feral state after five years of isolation. The girls are put in a welfare clinic under the watch of Dr. Gerald Dreyfuss. They refer to "Mama," a mysterious maternal protector figure. The girls are initially hostile to Lucas, but Victoria recognizes him after he gives her a pair of glasses and she can see properly. Dreyfuss agrees to support Lucas and his girlfriend Annabel's custody claim against the girls' maternal great-aunt, Jean Podolski, as long as Dreyfuss is allowed to monitor the girls' progress. Victoria acclimates quickly to domestic life while Lily retains much of her feral behavior.

Lucas is attacked by a mysterious entity and put into a coma, leaving Annabel to care for the girls alone. Though reluctant at first, she makes progress with Victoria, but Lily remains hostile. Alarmed by nightmares of a strange woman and Victoria's warning about Mama's jealousy, Annabel asks Dreyfuss to investigate further. Dreyfuss’s research brings to light the story of Edith Brennan, a mentally-ill asylum patient who died in the 1800s; he recovers a box from a government warehouse containing a baby's remains.

Annabel has a dream revealing Edith's past; when Edith was sent to the asylum, her child was taken from her and given to nuns. She escaped the asylum and took her baby back, stabbing one of the nuns caring for the baby in the process. Fleeing her pursuers, Edith jumped off a cliff, but before hitting the water below, she and the child made an impact with a large branch. Edith drowned, but the child's body snagged on the branch and did not fall with her into the water. Annabel realizes that Edith still hasn't realized her child was caught on the tree and doesn't understand why her baby wasn't in the water with her. Mama, Edith's troubled ghost, searched the woods for her child for years until she discovered Victoria and Lily and took them as surrogates.

Lucas regains consciousness after a vision of his dead twin tells him to go to the cabin to save his daughters. Victoria's growing closeness to Annabel makes her less willing to play with Mama, unlike Lily. Dreyfuss visits the cabin and is killed by Mama. Annabel takes Dreyfuss’s case file on Mama, including the body of her baby. Annabel and the girls are attacked by a jealous Mama, who kills Aunt Jean and uses her body to spirit the children away. Annabel and Lucas find the children on the same cliff where Mama leapt with her infant to their deaths over a century earlier, intent on re-enacting the deadly fall with Victoria and Lily.

When Annabel offers Mama the remains of her infant, Mama recognizes the child as her lost baby, and her appearance briefly turns human. However, when Annabel and Lucas try to bring the girls to safety, Lily calls out for Mama, causing her to revert to her monstrous form and attempt to take the girls again, nearly taking Lucas's life in the attempt.  Annabel clings to Victoria, who asks to stay with Annabel instead of leaving with Mama, which Mama accepts. After a tearful farewell, Mama and Lily plummet off the cliff. Mama and Lily happily embrace before hitting the branch, turning into a shower of moths. Annabel and Lucas embrace Victoria, who notices a moth landing on her hand, suggesting that Lily is still with her in spirit.

Cast
 Jessica Chastain as Annabel "Annie"
 Nikolaj Coster-Waldau as Lucas "Luke" Desange / Jeffrey Desange
 Megan Charpentier as Victoria Desange
 Morgan McGarry as Young Victoria
 Isabelle Nélisse as Lily Desange 
 Maya and Sierra Dawe as Young Lily
 Daniel Kash as Dr. Gerald Dreyfuss 
 Javier Botet as Mama
 Laura Guiteras and Melina Matthews as Mama (voice)
 Hannah Cheesman as Beautiful Mama / Edith Brennan
 Jane Moffat as Jean Podolski
 David Fox as Burnsie
 Julia Chantrey as Nina
 Elva Mai Hoover as Secretary
 Dominic Cuzzocrea as Ron
 Diane Gordon as Louise

Production
The film began production in Pinewood Toronto Studios on 3 October 2011. Production ended on 9 December 2011. Parts of the film were also shot in Quebec City, Quebec. Although the film was produced in Canada, it is set in Clifton Forge, Virginia. The film was initially scheduled for release in October 2012, but was later rescheduled for January to avoid competing with Paranormal Activity 4. Its success at that later date has, among with other dump months horror films, convinced studios to start opening horror movies year-round.

Reception

Critical reception
Mama received mixed reviews from critics. It holds a 63% approval rating on Rotten Tomatoes based on 166 reviews, with an average rating of 5.90/10. The website's critical consensus states: "If you're into old school scares over cheap gore, you'll be able to get over Mamas confusing script and contrived plot devices." Metacritic gives the film a weighted average score of 57 out of 100, based on 35 critics, indicating "mixed or average reviews".

Richard Roeper, writing for the Chicago Sun-Times, enjoyed the film, giving it three stars out of four and saying, "Movies like Mama are thrill rides. We go to be scared and then laugh, scared and then laugh, scared and then shocked. Of course, there's almost always a little plot left over for a sequel. It's a ride I'd take again." Owen Gleiberman, reviewing for Entertainment Weekly, gave the movie a B and said, "Mama lifts almost every one of its fear-factor visuals from earlier films: the rotting black passageways that spread like mold over the walls (very Ringu meets Repulsion); the fire in her eyes; the crouched figures that skitter and pounce à la the infamous 'spider' outtake from the original Exorcist; the way that Mama, with her arms like smoky-shadowy bent tendrils, evokes both the monster from the Alien films and also, in a funny way, the crumpled-puppet gothic mischievousness of Tim Burton animation. Nothing in the movie is quite original, yet Muschietti, expanding his original short, knows how to stage a rip-off with frightening verve. It helps to have an actress on hand as soulful as Jessica Chastain..."

IGN editor Scott Corulla rated the film 7.3 out of 10 and wrote, "This is a fine first film for director Andrés Muschietti and, despite some missteps and disappointments, very well could be a harbinger of interesting things to come for the helmer." The Huffington Post wrote, "With Del Toro's name up front, expect Mama to be the winter horror film of choice in 2013." The Philadelphia Inquirer called the film an "effectively spooky ghost story", adding, "Mama is full of arty tropes – sepia-toned flashbacks, flickering lights, menacing murmurings. The atmosphere is positively spectral. And it's easy to see why del Toro is a champion: Like his Pan's Labyrinth, there's a fairy-tale aspect (the film even begins with the title card "Once upon a time..."), with children in jeopardy, a witchy monster, and edge-of-the-precipice confrontations." Canyon News wrote, "The scares do indeed come a mile a minute and will unnerve even some of the toughest moviegoers." Mick LaSalle of the Houston Chronicle wrote, "Director Andres Muschietti is cinematically literate – in one example he borrows a flashbulb effect from Hitchcock's Rear Window – and he has visual panache. Much of the movie is surprisingly beautiful."

Box office
In the United States, the film earned $28,402,310 on its opening weekend, debuting at #1 and playing at 2,647 theaters. It grossed $148.1 million worldwide and is a commercial success. Additionally, Jessica Chastain, for the second time in her career, claimed the top two spots of the box-office with her starring roles in Mama and Zero Dark Thirty.

Accolades

Future
In February 2013, it was reported that a sequel was in the works. In January 2016, Universal announced that duo Dennis Widmyer and Kevin Kölsch would rewrite and direct the sequel. Chastain would not return for the sequel.

See also
 List of Canadian films of 2013
 List of Spanish films of 2013
 La Llorona

References

External links
 
 
 
 
 
 

2013 films
2013 horror films
2010s ghost films
English-language Canadian films
English-language Spanish films
English-language Mexican films
Works by Neil Cross
Features based on short films
Films about dysfunctional families
Films about murderers
Films directed by Andy Muschietti
Films set in 2008
Films set in Virginia
Films shot in Quebec
Films shot in Toronto
Films produced by Guillermo del Toro
2010s supernatural horror films
2010s monster movies
Uxoricide in fiction
Films scored by Fernando Velázquez
Canadian supernatural horror films
Spanish supernatural horror films
Mexican supernatural horror films
Canadian horror films
Spanish horror films
Mexican horror films
2013 directorial debut films
Universal Pictures films
2010s English-language films
2010s Canadian films
2010s Spanish films
2010s Mexican films